Leo Disend (November 7, 1915 – May 13, 1985) was a tackle in the National Football League.

Biography
Disend was born on November 7, 1915, in New York City.

Career
Disend played with the Brooklyn Dodgers for two seasons before playing his final season with the Green Bay Packers. He played at college level at Albright College.

See also
List of Green Bay Packers players

References

1915 births
1985 deaths
Players of American football from New York City
Brooklyn Dodgers (NFL) players
Green Bay Packers players
Albright College alumni